University Hospital is a large teaching hospital in London, Ontario, Canada, that is affiliated with the University of Western Ontario's Schulich School of Medicine & Dentistry. It is part of the London Health Sciences Centre hospital network and the Lawson Health Research Institute, which manages clinical research across all London hospitals. The hospital was formally opened in September 1972 by Canadian neurosurgeon Wilder Penfield.

Neurosurgeon Charles Drake achieved international renown for his innovative surgery for brain aneurysms at University Hospital, which attracted patients and surgeons from around the world to London.

References

External links
 History of LHSC

Hospital buildings completed in 1972
Teaching hospitals in Canada
Hospitals in London, Ontario
Hospitals established in 1972
Heliports in Ontario
Certified airports in Ontario
University of Western Ontario